("Let us raise"), WAB 43, is the second of eight settings of the hymn Tantum ergo composed by Anton Bruckner in .

History 
Bruckner composed the motet in the fall of 1845 at the end of his stay in Kronstorf or in 1846 at the beginning of his stay in St. Florian Abbey. The original manuscript, on which the Chorale Dir, Herr, dir will ich mich ergeben is also found, is stored in the archive of the abbey. Two copies of the manuscript are also stored in the  Österreichische Nationalbibliothek.

The motet was first published in band II/2, pp. 116–118 of the Göllerich/Auer biography.

Music 

The work of 36 bars in A major is scored for  choir and organ.

Joseph Anton Pfeiffer, the organist of Seitenstetten Abbey, to whom Bruckner gave the composition for critical analysis, found Bruckner "" ("a real musical genius").

Discography 
There are three recordings of this second setting of Tantum ergo:
 Jonathan Brown, Ealing Abbey Choir,  Anton Bruckner: Sacred Motets – CD: Herald HAVPCD 213, 1997 (without organ accompaniment)
 Thomas Kerbl, Chorvereinigung Bruckner 09, Anton Bruckner Chöre/Klaviermusik – CD:  LIVA 034 (first strophe only)
Sigvards Klava, Latvian Radio Choir, Bruckner: Latin Motets, 2019 – CD Ondine OD 1362 (first strophe only)

References

Sources 
 August Göllerich, Anton Bruckner. Ein Lebens- und Schaffens-Bild,  – posthumous edited by Max Auer by G. Bosse, Regensburg, 1932
 Anton Bruckner – Sämtliche Werke, Band XXI: Kleine Kirchenmusikwerke, Musikwissenschaftlicher Verlag der Internationalen Bruckner-Gesellschaft, Hans Bauernfeind and Leopold Nowak (Editor), Vienna, 1984/2001
 Cornelis van Zwol, Anton Bruckner 1824–1896 – Leven en werken, uitg. Thoth, Bussum, Netherlands, 2012.

External links 
 
 Tantum ergo A-Dur, WAB 43 Critical discography by Hans Roelofs 

Motets by Anton Bruckner
1845 compositions
Compositions in A major